Melattur Venkatarama Sastry (1770–1830) was a Telugu poet and playwright who is credited with founding the Bhagavatha Melas.

Early life 

Venkatarama Sastry was born in 1770 in Melattur in the then Thanjavur Maratha kingdom. His mother tongue was Telugu and his ancestors had migrated in the 1550s after the fall of the Vijayanagara Empire. Sastry's father was Gopalakrishnayya.

Venkatarama Sastry learnt music and dance from Lakshmanarya. Venkatarama Sastry was fluent in Sanskrit and was a great disciple of Narasimha.

Works 

Some of Venkatarama Sastry's important works are

 Prahalada Charitra
 Rukmangada Charitra
 Markandeya Charitra
 Ushaparinayamu
 Harischandra
 Sitakalyanamu

References 

 

1770 births
1830 deaths
People from Thanjavur district